A Maltese is any cat whose fur is either completely, or primarily, gray or blue and is of indeterminate breed.

Description
Many cats with such colouration are supposedly present on the island of Malta, which may have given rise to the use of the adjective in this context.

There are several cat breeds that always produce blue or gray fur, of whom the adjective may be used. These are the Russian Blue, the Chartreux and the Korat, none of which are associated with Malta. There are several other breeds that often produce blues such as the British Shorthair. The blue variant of this breed was so common that some thought it was its own breed called the "British Blue".

Regardless of breed, any cat with solid gray coloration has two pairs of double-recessive genes for the non-agouti and color-dilution traits, and so an exclusive mating between two solid gray cats should always produce solid gray kittens.

Cultural references
In literature, "The Maltese Cat" is the title of a 1895 short story (in the collection "The Day's Work") by Rudyard Kipling. The story is about a polo match set in the British colonial subcontinent, told from the point of view of one of the ponies, a gray named the Maltese Cat.

Patrick Leigh Fermor alludes to this usage in 1986's Between the Woods and the Water where, after a game of bicycle polo at a country house on the Great Hungarian Plain, he refers to the bicycles as Maltese Cats: "The other side won but we scored four goals, and when the iron Maltese Cats were back in their stands, we limped back to the steps, where Countess Denise and […] had been leaning on the balustrade like ladies gazing down into the lists."

O Henry alludes to a Maltese cat in his 1908 story A Lickpenny Lover as being "secretive and wary" when he compares the protagonist - an 18 year old girl Masie - to it.

A Maltese cat comes into the kitchen where main character Jim Burden is taking a bath on his first day at his grandparents' Nebraska farm in Willa Cather's 1918 novel My Ántonia.

See also
 Cat coat genetics

Notes

Cat coat types